Love Is Pain may refer to:

"Love Is Pain", song by Joan Jett from I Love Rock 'n Roll
"Love Is Pain", song by Girls Aloud from Out of Control
"Love Is Pain", song by Virgin Steel from Life Among the Ruins 
"Love Is Pain", song by Fergie from Double Dutchess